Protrachyceras is a genus of ceratitid ammonoid cephalopods belonging to the family Trachyceratidae.

Species
Protrachyceras costulatum Mansuy 1912
Protrachyceras deprati Mansuy 1912
Protrachyceras reitzi Boeckh 1875
Protrachyceras sikanianum McLearn 1930
Protrachyceras springeri Smith 1914
Protrachyceras storrsi Smith 1927 was rearranged to Sirenites storrsi (SMITH ) by Tozer 1968

Fossil record
Fossils of Protrachyceras are found in marine strata from the Triassic (age range: from 242.0 to 221.5 million years ago.).  Fossils are known from many localities in Afghanistan, Canada, China, India, Italy, Japan, Romania, the Russian Federation, Slovenia, Spain, Switzerland, Thailand and United States.

Gallery

Bibliography
 Arkell et al. Mesozoic Ammonoidea. Treatise on Invertebrate Paleontology, Part L. 1957
 Bernhard Kummel 1952. A Classification of Triassic Ammonoids. Jour of Paleontology, Vol 26, No.5, pp 847–853

References

Trachyceratidae
Ceratitida genera
Triassic ammonites of Europe
Triassic ammonites of North America